Doida por ti is a Portuguese telenovela broadcast by TVI. It was written by Maria João Mira, the working title of the series was Lua de Papel (Paper Moon). Doida Por Ti premiered on October 24, 2012. Originally, it ran from Monday to Friday in the hour preceding the news program Jornal das 8, the time slot previously reserved for Morangos com Açúcar. As of September 2013, with the launch of TVI's new telenovela, I Love It, the schedule was reduced to only one episode per week airing on Saturday nights. The series returned to its daily run, although moved towards midnight, on February 6, 2014, and aired its final episode on March 14, 2014.

Plot
Olívia is in love with Miguel who she thinks is the man of her dreams, though she hardly knows him. In fact, Miguel is a playboy who keeps secret romances with Bianca (his brother's bride) and other women. Bianca is also mad about Miguel. Her planned marriage to David, Miguel's brother, is kind of a business deal between their two families. David is not mad about anyone. He never had time for these things, he always wanted to be a well-behaved child who did what was expected of him. Accordingly, he agreed upon marrying Bianca because he was supposed to.

In the first episode, Miguel becomes the victim of an attack that nearly kills him. He is saved by Olívia who seems to have accomplished her wish to be close to him. Miguel remains in a coma for some time and is brought home to his parents in this state. Since Olívia was his savior and visited him in the hospital, Miguel's family takes her for his girlfriend. In reality, Olívia does not know him personally, but her attempts to tell the truth are constantly interrupted. So she becomes part of the family and even receives the possible engagement ring that is found in Miguel's flat. This part of the story seems to be inspired by the 1995 movie While You Were Sleeping.

Bianca is jealous of Olívia and sneaks her way into her home, pretending that she is escaping a domestic violence situation. She introduces herself as Susana and is offered to stay at Olívia's house. Eventually, Olívia admits that she is not engaged to Miguel. Bianca secretly taped this confession, reveals herself as Bianca, David's fiancée, and blackmails Olívia: Either she disappears and leaves the Campelo family alone, or she will take the taped confession to the police. (episode 9) At first, Olívia seems to comply, but then she appears at the house of the Campelo family and confesses. The family is about to expel her for good when finally Miguel awakens from his coma (episode 11). Funnily enough, he seems to recognize Olívia all of a sudden. Although he just remembers her from her job as a waitress, he learns that it was her who saved his life and tells everybody that she is, in fact, his fiancée. However, this is just another one of his tricks, he notices how well this story works with his parents and sticks to it while continuing his affair with Bianca.

The aftereffects of the Portuguese financial crisis are also present in the series. Carlos Cardoso loses his job and faces unemployment, he and his family are temporarily evicted from their home. Originally, Carlos is an enfermeiro (male nurse) and after another dubious temporary job (as a stripper in a nightclub) he applies for a position at the house of the rich Campelo family who are looking for a personal (female) nurse. He uses the Mrs. Doubtfire routine, dresses up as a woman and, under the name of Carlota Rufino, gets the job. Carlos's telling signature tune is Um Dia Mau (A Bad Day).

Cast
Sara Matos - Olívia Pimenta
João Catarré - David Campelo
Vera Kolodzig - Bianca Pessoa
Afonso Pimentel - Miguel Campelo
António Capelo - Leonardo Campelo
Rita Ribeiro - Gisela Campelo
Júlia Belard - Gabriela Matos
Paulo Pires - Mário Varela
Luísa Cruz - Carmo Varela
Sara Barros Leitão - Joana Varela
João Lagarto - Abel Antunes
Manuela Couto - Preciosa Antunes
André Nunes - Carlos Cardoso / Carlota Rufino
Patrícia Tavares - Soraia Antunes
Rodrigo Paganelli - Rui Cardoso
Filomena Gonçalves - Marília Gomes
Gabriela Barros - Vanessa Rufino
Marta Andrino - Eduarda Gomes
Fernando Luís - Samuel Galhardo
Sílvia Rizzo - Rita Galhardo
João Pacheco - Martim Galhardo
Vítor Fonseca - Fernando Saraiva
Lourenço Ortigão - Alberto Lopes
Núria Madruga - Tânia Ferreira
Ana Catarina - Rute Serafim
Almeno Gonçalves - Vasco Pimenta

External links
 Official homepage of the show at TVI (including a detailed episode guide)
 Short Who's Who (character descriptions in Portuguese)

References

Portuguese telenovelas
Televisão Independente telenovelas
2012 Portuguese television series debuts
2014 Portuguese television series endings
2012 telenovelas
Portuguese-language telenovelas